New York Performances is a live performance album by Borbetomagus, released in 1986 by Agaric Records.

Track listing

Personnel 
Adapted from New York Performances liner notes.

Borbetomagus
 Don Dietrich – saxophone, cover art
 Donald Miller – electric guitar
 Jim Sauter – saxophone

Production and additional personnel
 Louis Fleck – engineering
 Kenn Michael – photography

Release history

References

External links 
 New York Performances at Discogs (list of releases)

1986 live albums
Borbetomagus albums